Miko Revilla Palanca  (February 3, 1978 – December 9, 2019) was a Filipino character actor.

Life and career 
His older brother Bernard Palanca is also an actor, as was his maternal grandfather Armando Goyena. He had Chinese ancestry from his paternal family.

He played roles in primetime dramas such as Kay Tagal Kang Hinintay (2002-2003) and It Might Be You (2004-2005) where he starred alongside Bea Alonzo, whom he dated for 5 years. Palanca played Zossimo in the 2006 "Sineserye" Bituing Walang Ningning and was also part of the cast of Palos in 2008. He last made a television appearance on the ABS-CBN network in the 14th installment of the afternoon drama series Precious Hearts Romances Presents: Lumayo Ka Man Sa Akin in 2012 as an antagonist.

In mid-2012, he signed a contract with GMA Network thereby ending his career in ABS-CBN that started in 1997. He also worked as a freelance actor appearing on all TV networks.

On December 9, 2019, the actor died of suicide by jumping off a building in a residential area in Santolan Town in San Juan. It was rumored that he suffered from depression related to his love life.

His crypt and remains shares with his grandparents Paquita and Armando Goyena at Santuario De San Antonio in Forbes Park, Makati in Makati

Filmography

Television

Film

Music video
 This Guy's In Love With You Pare by Parokya Ni Edgar

References

External links

1978 births
2019 deaths
21st-century Filipino male actors
ABS-CBN personalities
De La Salle–College of Saint Benilde alumni
Star Magic
Filipino male comedians
Filipino male television actors
Filipino people of Chinese descent
People from San Juan, Metro Manila
2019 suicides
Suicides by jumping in the Philippines